is a railway station in Fushimi-ku, Kyoto, Japan. The station is managed by Kyoto Municipal Transportation Bureau which controls the municipal Karasuma Line subway.

Lines
The station is a junction of the following two railway lines:

 

The station is the southern terminal station on the former and an intermediate station of the latter. The two operators jointly provide through services between the two lines.

Layout
The station has two island platforms and four tracks. This is the sole subway station on the ground level in the Kyoto Subway system while all other stations are located underground.

Platforms

Adjacent stations

History
On April 1, 1940, the station was renamed Takeda Station. The Nara Electric Railway was merged into the Kintetsu Railway on October 1, 1963, so that the station belonged Kintetsu since then.

On June 11, 1988, when the extension of the Karasuma Line subway was completed the station was moved to its current site where is about 350 meters north of the original location and was expanded to serve both Kintetsu and subway lines. At this time the station was handed from Kintetsu to the transportation bureau.

See also
 List of railway stations in Japan

References

External links

 Station Facilities and Service
 Station Map

Railway stations in Japan opened in 1928
Railway stations in Kyoto Prefecture